Micro Ventures is an animated series created by Hanna-Barbera Productions which originally aired as a four-minute segment on The Banana Splits Adventure Hour. It ran for only four episodes from November 9, 1968 to December 21, 1968 on NBC.

Summary
In each episode, Professor Carter and his two teenage kids, Mike and Jill, use a shrinking machine (the micro-reducer) to shrink themselves and their dune buggy to miniature size to explore and experience the world from the perspective of an insect.

Voices
Don Messick - Professor Carter
Patsy Garrett - Jill Carter
Tommy Cook - Mike Carter

Episodes

References

External links
 
 Micro Ventures at The Big Cartoon DataBase

The Banana Splits
1960s American animated television series
1968 American television series debuts
1968 American television series endings
American children's animated action television series
American children's animated adventure television series
American children's animated science fiction television series
NBC original programming
Television series by Hanna-Barbera
Television series about size change
Television series segments